Naveh may refer to:

Places
Naveh, Amarlu, Rudbar County, Gilan Province, Iran
Naveh, Hormozgan, Iran
Naveh, Israel, a moshav in Israel
Naveh, Khorgam, Rudbar County, Gilan Province, Iran
Naveh, Kurdistan, Iran
Naveh, North Khorasan, Iran

People with the surname

Arieh Batun-Naveh (born 1933), Israeli Olympic high jumper
Dan Naveh (born 1960), Israeli politician
Yair Naveh (born 1957), Israeli general
Joseph Naveh (1928–2011), Israeli archaeologist and epigrapher

See also
Ghowch Naveh, village in Afghanistan